Steve Waterman (born February 27, 1950) is a producer for both movies and television.

He was co-producer for Casper and executive producer for Stuart Little and Stuart Little 2.

He also executive produced the live-action/CGI animated Alvin and the Chipmunks, Alvin and the Chipmunks: The Squeakquel, Alvin and the Chipmunks: Chipwrecked and Alvin and the Chipmunks: The Road Chip. He also co-created the 1990s television series High Tide.

In 1999, Waterman formed his own production company, Waterman Entertainment. In 2011, the company gained film rights for Strikeforce: Morituri from creator Peter B. Gillis expected to be its first live action film. Strikeforce was to start production in December 2011. On November 12, 2015, Waterman Entertainment purchased animation studio Film Roman.

Filmography

References

External links 
 

American film producers
Living people
1950 births